Yang Amat Berbahagia Cik Puan Julia Aishah Binti Abdul Rais, known professionally as Julia Rais, (born 19 February 1971) is a Malaysian former model and actress. She is a member of the Bendahara dynasty as the second wife of Abdullah of Pahang, the 6th modern Sultan of Pahang and 16th Yang di-Pertuan Agong of Malaysia.

Julia had a successful, but short, career in Malaysia as a film actress in the early 1990s and was known for her European features. She played the title character in the 1990 films Isabella and Mira Edora and in the 1992 film Nadia. Julia also had roles in the films Hati Bukan Kristal, Driving School, and Suci Dalam Debu. She received two awards and a nomination for Best Actress at the 9th Malaysian Film Festival in 1991. She ended her acting career shortly after marrying into the Pahang royal family.

Early life and family 

Julia was born in Kota Bharu, Kelantan on 19 February 1971. She is of Malays and British ancestry. She is the daughter of Abdul Rais Yeop, a Malaysian businessman and former board member of Sri Jaya Vehicles, from his first marriage to a British wife. She grew up in Damansara Jaya with her father and stepmother, Laily Ibrahim. She has a sister, Zalina, and two stepsiblings, Rafizal and Fazlyn. She is also a cousin of the politician Mohamed Nazri Abdul Aziz and a step-cousin of actress Juliana Ibrahim.

Career 

Julia began acting and modelling in the late 1980s in television commercials for Procter & Gamble and Rejoice Shampoo. Her first film was the 1990 romance film Isabella, where she played the title character. From 1990 to 1992 she appeared in several films as a supporting character. She played Nina, a journalist, in the film Hati Bukan Kristal and was the lead role in the comedy Driving School. She also had lead roles in the films Mira Edora, Nadia, and Suci Dalam Debu.

At the Malaysian Film Festival in 1991, Julia won the Bintang Harapan Award and the Best Film Award for Hati Bukan Kristal and was nominated for Best Actress for Mira Edora.

She ended her career in the entertainment industry shortly after marrying into the Pahang royal family.

Marriage and issue 
In 1991 she married Abdullah of Pahang, who was then the heir-apparent to the Sultanate of Pahang, as his second wife.  Her husband's first wife is Tunku Azizah Aminah Maimunah Iskandariah. They had a private ceremony at Fraser's Hill. 

Upon her marriage she is awarded the title of Cik Puan  (equivalent to the English "Lady") as an King's consort that was non-royal blood. She is styled Yang Amat Berbahagia (The Most Felicitous). 

Her husband succeeded his father as the sixth modern Sultan of Pahang on 15 January 2019. He was elected as the sixteenth Yang di-Pertuan Agong (King of Malaysia) on 24 January 2019.

She and the sultan have three daughters together:
Her Highness Tengku Puteri Raja Tengku Puteri Iman Afzan (born on 11 November 1992); married His Highness Tengku Abu Bakar Ahmad bin Almarhum Tengku Arif Bendahara Tengku Abdullah
 His Highness Tengku Zayn Edin Shah (born on 23 July 2019)
 Her Highness Tengku Aleya Norlini (born on 2 February 2022)
 Her Highness Tengku Puteri Raja Tengku Puteri Ilisha Ameera (born on 1 October 1993)
 Her Highness Tengku Puteri Raja Tengku Puteri Ilyana (born on 20 April 1997)

Personal life 
Julia is a practitioner of Sunni Islam and a spiritual follower of Yasmin Mogahed.

She lives in Great Britain with her mother, who is British. She did not attend the wedding of her eldest daughter in 2018.

Filmography

Film

Television film

References

External links 
 

Living people
1971 births
20th-century Malaysian actresses
Malaysian expatriates in England
Malaysian female models
Malaysian film actresses
Malaysian Muslims
Malaysian people of British descent
Malaysian people of Malay descent
Pahang royal consorts
Princesses by marriage
People from Kota Bharu